Calocidaris is a genus of echinoderms belonging to the family Cidaridae.

The species of this genus are found in Central America.

Species:

Calocidaris micans 
Calocidaris palmeri

References

Cidaridae
Cidaroida genera